Landtag elections in the Free State of Saxony (Freistaat Sachsen) during the Weimar Republic were held at irregular intervals between 1919 and 1930. Results with regard to the percentage of the vote won and the number of seats allocated to each party are presented in the tables below. On 31 March 1933, the sitting Landtag was dissolved by the Nazi-controlled central government and reconstituted to reflect the distribution of seats in the national Reichstag. The Landtag subsequently was formally abolished as a result of the "Law on the Reconstruction of the Reich" of 30 January 1934 which replaced the German federal system with a unitary state.

1919
The 1919 Saxony state election was held on 2 February 1919 to elect 97 members of the Volkskammer (People's Chamber).

1920
The 1920 Saxony state election was held on 14 November 1920 to the elect 96 members of the Landtag.

1922
The 1922 Saxony state election was held on 5 November 1922 to the elect 96 members of the Landtag.

1926
The 1926 Saxony state election was held on 31 October 1926 to the elect 96 members of the Landtag.

1929
The 1929 Saxony state election was held on 12 May 1929 to the elect 96 members of the Landtag.

1930
The 1930 Saxony state election was held on 22 June 1930 to the elect 96 members of the Landtag.

References

Elections in the Weimar Republic
Elections in Saxony
Saxony
Saxony
Saxony
Saxony
Saxony
Saxony